FK Mladá Boleslav is a Czech football club based in the city of Mladá Boleslav. Since 2004, the club has been participating in the Czech First League.

Mladá Boleslav were runners up in the 2005–06 Czech First League and went on to play in the 2006–07 UEFA Champions League, winning their opening tie against Vålerenga although they were eliminated in the third qualifying round by Galatasaray. The club won the Czech Cup in 2011 and qualified for the 2011–12 UEFA Europa League, although they were defeated over two legs by AEK Larnaca.

History

Recent times
The team was promoted to Czech First League for the first time in its history in 2004 and in their first top-flight season fought against relegation, eventually finishing in 14th place. The club's greatest success was achieved in the 2005–06 season, as they finished runners-up in the Czech First League, earning a place in the qualifying rounds of the UEFA Champions League. They came through their first tie, defeating Vålerenga (3–1 and 2–2), then lost against Galatasaray (2–5 away, 1–1 home), dropping into the UEFA Cup first round. The club went on to achieve a surprising 4–3 aggregate victory over Marseille (1st leg: 0–1, 2nd leg 4–2). However, the team was eliminated after reaching the group stage, taking just 3 points from 4 matches (Panathinaikos 0–1, Hapoel Tel Aviv 1–1, Paris Saint-Germain 0–0, Rapid București 1–1).

The following season, the club qualified directly for the first round of the UEFA Cup after finishing 3rd in the league. (Luboš Pecka was the top goalscorer in the league that year.) Qualification for the group stage was only narrowly secured by beating Palermo 4–2 on penalties after a nail biting 1–1 aggregate scoreline. On the verge of being eliminated with the score reading 1–0 Palermo, (with their goal in the first leg still standing) in the 2nd leg, Tomáš Sedláček scored the winner in the 2nd leg with only seconds to spare. In their group Mladá Boleslav defeated IF Elfsborg 3–1, but again failed to reach the knockout stages of the competition after losing matches against Villarreal 1–2, AEK Athens 0–1 and Fiorentina 1–2. The club subsequently achieved a 7th place league finish in the 2007–08 season, missing out on European qualification.

The major sponsor of the club is Škoda Auto.

Historical names

 1902 – SSK Mladá Boleslav (Studentský sportovní klub Mladá Boleslav)
 1910 – Mladoboleslavský SK (Mladoboleslavský Sportovní klub)
 1919 – Aston Villa Mladá Boleslav
 1948 – Sokol Aston Villa Mladá Boleslav
 1949 – ZSJ AZNP Mladá Boleslav (Základní sportovní jednota Automobilové závody národní podnik Mladá Boleslav) – merged with Sokol Slavoj Mladá Boleslav and Sokol Meteor Čejetičky
 1950 – merged with Sokol Mladoboleslavský
 1959 – TJ Spartak Mladá Boleslav AZNP (Tělovýchovná jednota Spartak Mladá Boleslav Automobilové závody národní podnik)
 1965 – TJ Škoda Mladá Boleslav (Tělovýchovná jednota Škoda Mladá Boleslav)
 1971 – TJ AŠ Mladá Boleslav (Tělovýchovná jednota Auto Škoda Mladá Boleslav)
 1990 – FK Mladá Boleslav (Fotbalový klub Mladá Boleslav)
 1992 – FK Slavia Mladá Boleslav (Fotbalový klub Slavia Mladá Boleslav)
 1994 – FK Bohemians Mladá Boleslav (Fotbalový klub Bohemians Mladá Boleslav)
 1995 – FK Mladá Boleslav (Fotbalový klub Mladá Boleslav)

Players

Current squad
.

Out on loan

Notable former players

Player records in the Czech First League
.
Highlighted players are in the current squad.

Most appearances

Most goals

Most clean sheets

Current technical staff
Technical director: Jiří Plíšek
Assistant coaches: Pavel Medynský, Marek Kulič
Goalkeeping coach: Jiří Malík

Managers

Karel Stanner (1996–01)
Vlastimil Petržela (2002)
Martin Pulpit (2002–04)
Milan Bokša (2004)
Dušan Uhrin, Jr. (July 2004 – June 2007)
Zdeněk Ščasný (Sep 2007 – March 2008)
Karel Stanner (March 2008 – June 2008)
Pavel Hapal (June 2008 – June 2009)
Dušan Uhrin, Jr. (July 2009 – Dec 2009)
Karel Stanner (Jan 2010 – May 2011)
Miroslav Koubek (July 2011 – Sept 2012)
Ladislav Minář (Sep 2012 – Jan 2014)
Karel Jarolím (Jan 2014 – Aug 2016)
Leoš Kalvoda (Aug 2016 – Dec 2016)
Martin Svědík (Dec 2016 – June 2017)
Dušan Uhrin, Jr. (June 2017 – Feb 2018)
Jozef Weber (Feb 2018 – Dec 2020)
Karel Jarolím (Dec 2020 – Feb 2022)
Pavel Hoftych (Feb 2022 –)

History in domestic competitions

 Seasons spent at Level 1 of the football league system: 17
 Seasons spent at Level 2 of the football league system: 6
 Seasons spent at Level 3 of the football league system: 3
 Seasons spent at Level 4 of the football league system: 2

Czech Republic

History in European competitions

Notes
 2Q: Second qualifying round
 3Q: Third qualifying round
 PO: Play-off round

Honours
Czech Cup
 Winners (2): 2010–11, 2015–16
Czech 2. Liga
 Winners: 2003–04
Bohemian Football League
 Winners: 1997–98

Club records

Czech First League records
Best position: 2nd (2005–06)
Worst position: 14th (2004–05)
Biggest home win: Mladá Boleslav 6–0 Příbram (2019–20) 
Biggest away win: Teplice 0–8 Mladá Boleslav (2018–19)
Biggest home defeat: Mladá Boleslav 0–4 Teplice (2012–13), Mladá Boleslav 0–4 Sparta Prague (2013–14)
Biggest away defeat: Plzeň 7–1 Mladá Boleslav (2019–20)

References

External links
 in Czech
 in English

 
Football clubs in the Czech Republic
Association football clubs established in 1902
Czech First League clubs
1902 establishments in Austria-Hungary